Tapiola is an unincorporated community in Houghton County, Michigan, United States.

History
Tapiola was founded by Finnish Americans; they named the community after the Finnish term for the land of the forest god.

Education
In 1913 the John A. Doelle Agricultural School opened in Tapiola.

References

Unincorporated communities in Houghton County, Michigan
Unincorporated communities in Michigan
Houghton micropolitan area, Michigan